Gaby Vallejo Canedo (born 24 September 1941) is a Bolivian writer. With over 40 published works, she has dabbled in narrative genres such as novels and children's literature.

Biography
Gaby Vallejo Canedo was born in Cochabamba on 24 September 1941. She studied at the Normal Catholic Institute of Cochabamba, obtaining the title of Professor of Literature, and earned a licentiate in Education Sciences at the University of San Simón. She completed a diploma in Latin American Literature at the Caro and Cuervo Institute in Bogotá.

Teaching
Vallejo taught at the University of San Simón for 18 years.

Academia Boliviana de la Lengua
Vallejo has been a member of the Academia Boliviana de la Lengua since 27 July 2001, occupying its "H" chair.

Awards and distinctions
 First mention for the Erich Guttentag National Novel Award (1976)
 Erich Guttentag National Novel Award (1977)
 Hans Christian Andersen Honor Roll (Oslo, 1988)
 Named Meritorious Citizen of Cochabamba (1989)
 Dante Aliguieri Award, Accademia Cassentinese, for the Defense of Democracy Through Literature (Venice, 1991)
 Youth Literature Award, Ministry of Education (1996)
 National Prize for Thought and Culture (Sucre, 2001)
 IBBY-ASAHI Reading Promotion Award  (2003)
 Golden Flag, granted by the National Senate (2008)
 Cultural Merit Medal (Pro Arte, 2010)
 International Prize of the Hispanic Literary and Cultural Institute (Paraguay, 2011)
 Literary career recognition from the University of San Simón (2013)
 Doctor honoris causa from the University of San Simón (2019)
 Named a Universal Ambassador of Culture by the Tarija Union of Writers and Artists and the UNESCO Latin American Writers' Union (2019)

Works
Vallejo's narrative style has been defined as that of literary realism. Her novel ¡Hijo de opa! was adapted into the 1984 film Los Hermanos Cartagena, directed by Paolo Agazzi. In 2017, her literary output was analyzed by Willy Oscar Muñoz, and the result was published in the book La Narrativa Contestataria y Social de Gaby Vallejo Canedo.

Novels
 Los vulnerables (1973)
 ¡Hijo de opa! (1977)
 Juvenal Nina (1981)
 Mi primo es mi papá (1989)
 La sierpe empieza en cola (1991)
 Con los ojos cerrados (1993)
 Encuentra tu ángel y tu demonio (1998), 
 Amalia desde el espejo del Tiempo (2012), biography of Amalia Villa de la Tapia

References

1941 births
20th-century Bolivian women writers
21st-century Bolivian women writers
Bolivian children's writers
Bolivian educators
Bolivian novelists
Living people
People from Cochabamba